Ozie Boo! is a Chilean 3D animation in 60fps version television series for preschoolers that began in April 2006. It is produced by the chilean production company Atiempo, a company based in Santiago, Chile and in the US by PorchLight Entertainment and it’s distributed by the chilean production company Pájaro. In Chile, the first season was broadcast on TVN in the children's block Tronia, and the second season was broadcast on Chilevision. The series is broadcast in about 10 countries. Ozie Boo! has also been released worldwide on VHS/DVD. Season 2 has been available in the USA since December 2006. Season 3 was broadcast in 2007. In Italy the series started broadcasting in 2008 on kids’ channel Rai YoYo. It also airs on Ici Radio-Canada Télé in French-language Canada and still airs today.

The first and second season has a length of 7 minutes. A revival series was created in 2010 as Ozie Boo!: Save The Planet and follows the 5 penguins, who learn about helping the environment in a classroom with their teacher, Mr. Pelican. "Ozie Boo!: Save The Planet!" was broadcast on UCV Television and made by the chilean production company Atiempo with the participation of Gobierno de Chile.

Synopsis 
Ozie Boo tells the story of five baby penguins, four boys and a girl, who learn to cohabit in a joyous and friendly way and have many adventures in their home, located in the middle of the Atlantic Ocean.

Characters 
The Ozieboos are five baby penguins:
 Ed (green)
 Fred (orange)
 Ned (blue)
 Nelly (pink)
 Ted (red)

Other characters include:
 Rajah, the baby Siberian tiger
 Mikky and Nikky the polar bear cubs
 Mel the starfish
 Wally and Polly, the baby belugas
 Sky the albatross
 Mr. Pelican

External links 
 Ozie Boo! website

Chilean children's television series
Chilean animated television series
Computer-animated television series
Animated television series about children
Animated television series about penguins